S. J. Clarkson is a British television and film director.

Career
Clarkson's credits include the series Doctors, Casualty, EastEnders, Footballers' Wives, and Life on Mars, as well as the American series Heroes, House, Dexter, and Ugly Betty. In 2008, she co-created the British series Mistresses. In 2010, she also directed the film Toast.

In 2019, she signed on to direct the Game of Thrones prequel for HBO.

Selected filmography
Film
 Toast (2010) (TV)
 Madame Web (2024) 

Television

References

External links

Living people
British expatriates in the United States
British television directors
British women film directors
British women television directors
Place of birth missing (living people)
Year of birth missing (living people)